The Westerwald Club or WWV was founded in 1888 in Selters in the German mountain range of Westerwald and has about 7,000 members in 40 branches. It acts as a local history society for the whole geographical region of the Westerwald. The main club supports and coordinates the activities of its branches and takes responsibility for wider tasks. It is entered in the club register of the Amtsgericht of Montabaur (VR 485). Its branches support the aims of the main club at local level through largely independent initiatives and events.

The motto of the Westerwald Club is "Hui! Wäller? - Allemol!" This slogan was chosen in a 1913 prize competition from over 60 entries. The winner was local poet and farmer, Adolf Weiß (1861–1938) from Mademühlen.

The meaning of the greeting was explained in his poem: 

The Westerwald Club is a member of the Associations of German Alpine and Hiking Clubs and supports hiking and tourism. The main club offers multi-day walks through the Westerwald, as well as hiking holidays abroad. The branches organise regular walks and excursions.

The club waymarks and manages a hiking trail network over 2,300 km long, including the Druidensteig, the Limes Trail and the Westerwald Trail. Many branches maintain their local footpaths. The branches in Aßlar, Herborn and Wetzlar-Niedergirmes also have their own walking hostels, in which hikers may stay overnight at low cost. Walking hostels without accommodation are run by the branches in Blasbach, Dillenburg, Selters and Wißmar.

Branches 
 Aßlar
 Bad Ems (Taunus Club)
 Bad Marienberg
 Blasbach
 Buchholz (Westerwald)
 Daaden
 Daubach (Westerwald)
 Dierdorf
 Dillenburg
 Eitelborn
 Flammersfeld
 Fluterschen
 Hachenburg
 TV Hangelar (St. Augustin)
 Helmeroth
 Herborn
 Herdorf
 Herschbach
 Hillscheid
 Höhn
 Höhr-Grenzhausen
 Horbach (Westerwald) (Buchfinkenland)
 Koblenz
 Köln
 Limburg-Dornburg
 Montabaur
 Neuwied
 Nistertal
 Rennerod
 Selters (Westerwald)
 Steimel
 Unnau
 Urbach (Westerwald)
 Waldernbach
 Wallmerod
 Weilburg
 Westerburg
 Wetzlar-Niedergirmes
 Windhagen
 Wißmar

Awards 
The following branches of the Westerwald Club have been awarded the Eichendorff-Plakette:
 2010 Zweigverein Daaden

External links 
 Westerwaldverein

References 

Westerwald
1888 establishments in Germany
Middle Hesse
Heritage organizations